The National Union for Democracy and Progress  (UNDP) is a political party in the Central African Republic led by Michel Amine.

History
The UNDP was launched in 2014, and officially recognised on 17 July. It did not nominate a presidential candidate in the 2015–16 general elections, but it emerged as the joint-largest party in the National Assembly, winning 13 of the 131 seats.

References

2014 establishments in the Central African Republic
Political parties established in 2014
Political parties in the Central African Republic